Alega Gang: Public Enemy No.1 of Cebu is a 1988 action crime film co-edited and directed by Pepe Marcos and written by Jose N. Carreon. It stars Ramon 'Bong' Revilla Jr. in the lead role, alongside Robin Padilla, Princess Punzalan, Beverly Vergel, Perla Bautista, Paquito Diaz, Zandro Zamora, Bomber Moran, and Baldo Marro. Set in Cebu, it tells an account of the life of Ulysses "Boboy" Alega (Revilla), and his descent into crime. Originally released on June 23, 1988, it was re-released on April 2, 1994, with Padilla receiving equal billing with Revilla.

Critic Lav Diaz gave a positive review of the film, commending its clear characterization of the main character in comparison to other films involving outlaws.

Plot
In 1985, jeepney driver Ulysses "Boboy" Alega loses his vehicle just as he needed money to pay his rent and buy medications for his child. After he accidentally shoots and kills a person during a fight, Boboy is then imprisoned and tortured by the police. With his release from prison, Boboy eventually joins a group involved in arms smuggling, and after some time its members come to consider him as their leader.

Cast
Ramon "Bong" Revilla as Ulysses "Boboy" Alega
Robin Padilla
Princess Punzalan as the sister of Ulysses
Beverly Vergel
Perla Bautista
Paquito Diaz
Zandro Zamora
Bomber Moran
Rommel Valdez
Joseph de Cordova
Ronel Victor
Jon Hernandez
Bing Davao
King Gutierrez
E.R. Ejercito
Edwin Reyes
Bobby Zshornack
Alain Jason Bautista
Mark Alvin Bautista

Release
Alega Gang was released in the Philippines on June 23, 1988. On April 2, 1994, the film was re-released by Moviestars Production, with Padilla receiving equal billing with Revilla.

Box office
The film was box office hit in the Philippines, especially in Cebu City, where according to the Philippine Daily Inquirer, there was an alleged incident of people breaking a box office window while demanding tickets.

Critical response
Lav Diaz, writing for Manila Standard, gave a favorable review of Alega Gang, commending its clear illustration of the main character as a victim of society, unlike many other films featuring "police characters". Though he commented that Ulysses' final dying shout was "corny", he concluded that the film is a good addition to the list of intense Filipino action films.

References

External links

1988 films
1980s crime action films
Action films based on actual events
Crime films based on actual events
Filipino-language films
Films about arms trafficking
Films set in 1985
Films set in 1987
Films set in Cebu
Films shot in Cebu
Philippine crime action films
Moviestars Production films
Films directed by Pepe Marcos